Panayot Panayotov may refer to:

 Panayot Panayotov (footballer) (1930–1996), Bulgarian footballer
 Panayot Panayotov (singer) (born 1951), Bulgarian pop singer